Eternal Rhythm is a jazz album composed by Don Cherry. It was recorded in conjunction with the Berlin Jazz Festival in November 1968.

In 2022, the Ezz-thetics label reissued the album along with Where Is Brooklyn? on the compilation Where Is Brooklyn? & Eternal Rhythm, Revisited.

Reception

The AllMusic review by Brian Olewnick awarded the album 5 stars stating "Eternal Rhythm is Don Cherry's masterwork and one of the single finest recordings from the jazz avant-garde of the 1960s. It is required listening".

In a review for The Quietus, Jennifer Lucy Allan called the album "the connecting piece between the pace, tension and excitement of Cherry's free jazz playing in Ornette Coleman's groups, and the relaxed invitation to international and folk forms of rhythm that came later." She commented: "I hear this album as movement between moments, and am lifted from my seat with sheer joy, any time I hear the marching theme land 12 minutes into Part One, after the frenetic generations of the rhythm section and Sonny Sharrock's guitar are batted away by Cherry's trumpet herald, and the band falls into step for a few brief and triumphant turns around the parade ground."

Track listing

1. "Eternal Rhythm Part I" - 17:49 (Cherry)
a. Baby's Breath
b. "Sonny Sharrock"
c. Turkish Prayer
d. Crystal Clear (exposition)
e. Endless Beginnings
f. Baby's Breath (unaccompanied)

2. "Eternal Rhythm Part II" - 23:40 (Cherry)
a. Autumn Melody
b. Lanoo
c. Crystal Clear (Development)
d. Screaming J
e. Always Beginnings

Personnel

Don Cherry - cornet, gender and saron (gamelan), Bengali, flute in A, bamboo flute in C, metal flute in B flat, plastic flute in C, Haitian Guard, Northern Bells, voice
Albert Mangelsdorff - trombone
Eje Thelin - trombone
Bernt Rosengren - tenor saxophone, oboe, clarinet, flute
Sonny Sharrock - guitar
Karl Berger - vibraphone, piano, gender (gamelan)
Joachim Kühn - piano, prepared piano
Arild Andersen - bass
Jacques Thollot - drums, saron (gamelan), gong, bells, voice
Cover and layout: Heinz Bähr

References

Don Cherry (trumpeter) live albums
1969 live albums
MPS Records live albums
Live avant-garde jazz albums
Live jazz fusion albums